opened in Hakodate, Hokkaidō, Japan in 2011. Hands-on activities, including magatama-making and -knitting", are also available.

Gallery

See also
 Jōmon Archaeological Sites in Hokkaidō, Northern Tōhoku, and other regions
 Hakodate City Museum

References

External links

 Hakodate Jōmon Culture Center

Museums in Hakodate
Archaeological museums in Japan
2011 establishments in Japan
Museums established in 2011
Jōmon period